Ghetty Green is the debut studio album by American rapper Project Pat. It was released on September 14, 1999, through Hypnotize Minds/Loud Records with distribution via RED Distribution. Recording session took place at Hypnotize Minds Studio and Cotton Row Recording Studio in Memphis, Tennessee. Production was primarily handled by DJ Paul and Juicy J, who also served as executive producers. It features guest appearances from Three 6 Mafia, Cash Money Millionaires, Crucial Conflict, Krayzie Bone and Noreaga. The album peaked at number 52 on the Billboard 200 and at number 9 on the Top R&B/Hip-Hop Albums chart in the United States.

The album spawned two singles: "Represent It" and "Ballers". "Ballers" made it to number 75 on the US Billboard Hot R&B/Hip-Hop Songs chart.

Track listing

Personnel
Patrick Houston – main artist
Jordan Houston – featured artist, producer, executive producer
Paul Beauregard – featured artist, producer, executive producer
Darnell Carlton – featured artist
Ricky Dunigan – featured artist
Lola Mitchell – featured artist
Anthony Henderson – featured artist
Victor Santiago, Jr. – featured artist
Byron Thomas – featured artist, producer
Bryan Christopher Brooks – featured artist
Christopher Noel Dorsey – featured artist
Terius Gray – featured artist
Crucial Conflict – featured artists
Kirk Clayton – programming
Lil' Pat – mixing & recording (tracks: 1, 3-6, 8, 9, 11, 13-19)
Niko Lyras – mixing & recording (tracks: 2, 7, 10, 12, 20)
L. Nix & Company Inc. – mastering
Pen & Pixel – artwork, design
Steve Roberts – photography

Chart history

References

External links

1999 debut albums
Project Pat albums
Loud Records albums
Albums produced by DJ Paul
Albums produced by Juicy J
Albums produced by Mannie Fresh